Yayuk Basuki was the defending champion and successfully defended her title, by defeating Florencia Labat 6–4, 3–6, 7–6(7–1) in the final.

Seeds

Draw

Finals

Top half

Bottom half

References

External links
 Official results archive (ITF)
 Official results archive (WTA)

Danamon Open
1994 WTA Tour